Blue lupine is a common name for several plants and may refer to:

Lupinus angustifolius, a European species with edible seeds
Lupinus perennis, native to eastern North America
Lupinus pilosus, endemic to Israel